"Please Don't Stop The Rain" is the eighth single by James Morrison, and the third from his second album, Songs for You, Truths for Me. Morrison co-wrote the song with Ryan Tedder, from OneRepublic, who also sings in the background vocals. The single was released on 30 March 2009.

Track listing
Digital download
 "Please Don't Stop The Rain" (Live From Air Studios) – 3:54
 "Please Don't Stop The Rain" – 3:56

German CD single
 "Please Don't Stop The Rain" (Radio Edit)
 "Once When I Was Little" (Live From Air Studios)

Music video
The music video for "Please Don't Stop The Rain" is available to view on Morrison's official Youtube channel. It begins with Morrison walking in a hilly area. Half-way through the chorus, Morrison is suddenly walking through fog, with sparks 'raining' down upon him. This happens for the rest of the song, joined with several shots of a husky running around in the same foggy conditions.

Critical reception
Mayer Nissim from digitalspy gave a mixed review for the single and gave 2 out of 5 stars. He wrote, "The third single from James Morrison's platinum-selling second album Songs For You, Truths For Me doesn't stray too far from the template of his previous releases. Morrison's voice is fine enough and the production sounds sleek and expensive, but unfortunately the music itself is quite unmemorable.
Please Don't Stop The Rain' begins with a Coldplay-esque piano riff and an anaemic melody that improves little by the time it reaches the chorus. You're forced to look to the lyrics for a reason to keep listening, but the earnestness of each clumsy metaphor quickly tries the patience ("I can see the skies are changing, no longer shades of blue"). Morrison's pleasingly gruff tones deserve some decent writing to tease them out, but sadly this isn't up to the job".

Charts
In the United Kingdom, "Please Don't Stop The Rain" entered the charts at number 68, rising to 39 two weeks later. On the issue dated 19 April 2009, the song rose to #33, and the following week, it started to fall, going down to #34. The week after, the song fell to #42. However, despite not reaching the commercial success of previous singles, it has become a big radio hit in Britain.

References

2009 singles
James Morrison (singer) songs
Songs written by James Morrison (singer)
Songs written by Ryan Tedder
2008 songs
Polydor Records singles